Flin Flon/Channing Water Aerodrome  is located  southeast of Flin Flon, Manitoba, Canada on the northwest arm of Schist Lake, Manitoba. Unlike the main Flin Flon Airport, it is located within the municipal limits of Flin Flon. The airport includes an airstrip which crosses Channing Drive at an unmarked intersection close to the southeastern end of the runway.

See also
Flin Flon Airport
Flin Flon/Bakers Narrows Water Aerodrome

References

Registered aerodromes in Manitoba
Seaplane bases in Manitoba